The Cardona Residence is a historic house in Aguadilla, Puerto Rico. It was built in 1913. It is "one of the most interesting and best preserved" houses in Aguadilla from its era.

The house was listed on the U.S. National Register of Historic Places in 1985. In 2005 it was acquired as the new home of the Museum of Art of Aguadilla and the Caribbean. It remains in use by the museum as of 2016.

Gallery

See also

National Register of Historic Places listings in Aguadilla, Puerto Rico

References

External links
, official website 
Summary sheet from the Puerto Rico State Historic Preservation Office 
Photo from the Puerto Rico State Historic Preservation Office

Houses completed in 1913
Houses on the National Register of Historic Places in Puerto Rico
1913 establishments in Puerto Rico
Neoclassical architecture in Puerto Rico
National Register of Historic Places in Aguadilla, Puerto Rico
Art museums and galleries in Puerto Rico
Museums established in 2005
2005 establishments in Puerto Rico
Historic house museums in Puerto Rico
Museums in Aguadilla, Puerto Rico